Libby is a mobile app which supports users in accessing library services. It is a product of OverDrive, Inc.

Upon use, Libby requests the reader's library card. With the library card, Libby connects to the user's account at the library and provides support in checking out books. The intent is improved service and ease of accessing the library instead of using the library's own website.

A reviewer for Literary Review of Canada praised Libby's management of reading data, including books read and books in queue for reading. A reviewer for Time called Libby one of the best apps of 2018. Popular Mechanics named Libby as one of the best apps of the 2010s.

Free library services of the sort that Libby provides are an unusual historical custom for providing free access to media when in contemporary time, almost all such services come from commercial vendors.

References

EPUB readers
Book rental